In memoriam is a Latin phrase equivalent to "in memory (of)", referring to remembering or honouring a deceased person.

In Memoriam may refer to:

Music

Classical compositions
 Overture in C, "In Memoriam", by Arthur Sullivan, 1866
 In Memoriam: President Garfield's Funeral March, by John Philip Sousa, 1881
 In Memoriam (Sibelius), a funeral march by Jean Sibelius, 1910
 In Memoriam, a symphonic poem by Havergal Brian, 1910
 In Memoriam, an orchestral piece by Arnold Bax, 1916
 In memoriam (Moore), a symphonic poem by Douglas Moore, 1943
 In Memoriam, an orchestral piece by Lepo Sumera, 1972
 In Memoriam..., an orchestral arrangement by Alfred Schnittke of his Piano Quintet, 1972/1978
 In Memoriam, a composition by Lewis Spratlan, 2009

Albums
In Memoriam: Hungarian Composers, Victims Of The Holocaust, a 2008 album by various artists
 In Memoriam, a 2005 album by Living Sacrifice
 In Memoriam (Modern Jazz Quartet album), 1973
In Memoriam: Margaret Thatcher, a 2013 EP by Chumbawamba
In Memoriam (Small Faces album), 1969

Songs
 "In Memoriam", by Apocalyptica from the 2000 album Cult
 "In Memoriam", by Evile from the 2011 album Five Serpent's Teeth
 "In Memoriam", by HammerFall from the 2002 album Crimson Thunder
 "In Memoriam", by Moonspell from the 2006 album Memorial
 "In Memoriam", by Steve Hackett from the 1999 album Darktown
 "Loss (In Memoriam)", by Saturnus from the 2000 album Martyre

Other uses
 In Memoriam (film), a 1977 Spanish film 
 "In Memoriam A.H.H." or "In Memoriam", an 1850 poem by Alfred, Lord Tennyson
 In Memoriam (video game), 2003 
 "In Memoriam" (Homeland), an episode of Homeland
 "In Memoriam", several satirical poems by fictitious writer E. J. Thribb for Private Eye
 In memoriam segment, a memorial included in an awards show or other aired event

See also

 Memorial (disambiguation)
 Memoriam, an English band
 In Memoriam, about the In Memoriam wiki, a former Wikimedia project on the September 11, 2001, attacks